Rigoni is an Italian surname. Notable people with the surname include:

Beatrice Rigoni (born 1995), Italian rugby union player 
Benito Rigoni (born 1936), Italian bobsledder
Emiliano Rigoni (born 1993), Argentine footballer
Gianluigi Rigoni (born 1956), Italian footballer
Guy Rigoni (born 1974), Australian rules footballer
Luca Rigoni (born 1984), Italian footballer
Marco Rigoni (born 1980), Italian footballer
Mario Rigoni Stern (1921–2008), Italian writer
Massimo Rigoni (born 1961), Italian ski jumper
Nicola Rigoni (born 1990), Italian footballer
Sergio Rigoni (born 1986), Italian cross-country skier
Severino Rigoni (1914–1992), Italian cyclist

Italian-language surnames